Logan Guleff (born July 20, 2002) is a television personality, cookbook author, entrepreneur, and owner of Logan's Underground Supper Club.  In 2014, he became the winner of the second season of the American reality cooking competition MasterChef Junior. In 2016, Guleff was listed in Time Magazine's "30 Most Influential Teens" as "a rising star in the culinary world".

Early cooking career
Logan started cooking at the age of three. At the age of nine, his recipe for the "Jif Most Creative Sandwich" contest won him an appearance on Today on NBC. "I went on TV a bunch with my recipe and it was really fun. I got so disappointed that I did not win the grand prize, so my Mom suggested that I enter another contest and I won (the Epicurious Healthy Challenge trip)."

MasterChef Junior 
On December 16, 2014, Logan won the second season of MasterChef Junior.

Logan's winning meal included an appetizer of saffron spot prawns with olive tapenade and smoked aioli, an entree of salt-crusted branzino and a dessert of Meyer lemon madeleines with goat cheese mousse and a berry compote.

He has also appeared on Season 4 (Cupcake Judge) & Season 5 (Show Clip) & Season 6 (Guest) of the show.

Recognition 

Logan has won several food competitions including one which took him to the White House to meet the President Barack Obama and the First Lady Michelle Obama. He visited The White House with President Barack Obama in 2012 at the Epicurious Kid's State Dinner Healthy Lunch Challenge.

In 2013, Logan became the first and only child judge to complete the training course given by the Memphis World Championship BBQ committee as a certified judge. In 2015, Logan became the youngest certified Judge (age 12) at the World Championship Barbecue Cooking Contest. He also judged the International Young Chef Olympiad in India in 2017.

In 2015, Logan became a Finalist in Shorty Awards for recognition in producing real-time short form content in the FOOD category along his social media platforms. Same year, named as a presenter for the Reality Television Awards (Hollywood) along with MasterChef Junior winning best "New Cast".

In the summer of 2015, Logan became a spokesperson for the "Get Kids Cooking" campaign and initiative, GetKidsCooking.ca (in Canada).

In 2016, Logan Guleff was named the "Next Great Southern Cook in America" by Southern Living Magazine, along with Forbes magazine naming him one of the Young Innovators Who Are Changing the World. Winner of the James Beard Foundation 2016 Blended Burger Project™.

At the age of 14, Logan inked a partnership deal with meal delivery kit service Chef'd to present several of his dishes, including his winning James Beard Sustainable Mushroom Monster Burger (2017).

In 2018, Logan Guleff won the Gourmand World Cookbook Award for the Best New Cookbook (US) for "Cooking Dreams", and in May 2018 the book was announced as the winner of "The Best in The World First Cookbook" in Yantai, China. He was selected as a TEDx speaker on the subject of "The Art of The Flavor".

In 2021, Logan becomes the first chef to offer NFT Non-fungible token Dining Experience.

Television

Awards and nominations

Bibliography

See also 
List of people from Memphis, Tennessee

References

External links
 Order Up With Logan Blog (Start date 2010)

2002 births
Living people
People from Memphis, Tennessee